Caux is a commune in the Hérault department in southern France.

Geography

Caux is a Circulade village located near Pézenas

Toponymy

The origin of the name "Caux" has two possible explanations:

It can come from Occitan "caus" which means "lime". This is possible because limestone is very present on the territory, lime kilns are numerous; we find their remains at Sallèles and Maro Road.
The name can come from an expression of pre-Indo-European origin: "cal-so", that is to say rock, shelter. Indeed, on its base at 103 meters above sea level, Caux dominates the surroundings.

History

Population

Education

Sport

Administration

Personalities

Jean-Jacques Causse
Dom Bédos de Celles

See also
Communes of the Hérault department

References

External links
 Official Web site
 Tourist office Web site

Communes of Hérault